GlaxoSmithKline Pakistan is a Pakistani pharmaceutical company which is a subsidiary of British company GSK. It is the largest pharmaceutical company in Pakistan.

History
The company started its operations in Pakistan as Glaxo Laboratories Pakistan Ltd and was listed on the Karachi Stock Exchange in 1951.

GSK Pakistan equation was formed when Beecham, Glaxo Welcome and Smith Kline, all having a big name in the pharmaceutical market and that were separate entities before, merged in 2002.

In December 2010, the company acquired Stiefel Laboratories operations in Pakistan.

GlaxoSmithKline Consumer Healthcare Pakistan Limited (GSKCH) 
In 2015, GlaxoSmithKline Consumer Healthcare Pakistan Limited (GSKCH) was demerged from GlaxoSmithKline Pakistan Limited (GLAXO).

in 2016, GSKCH started operations as an independent company.

In 2017, GSKCH got listed on PSX.

GLAXO vs GSKCH 
GLAXO (GlaxoSmithKline Pakistan Limited) manufactures and markets a wide variety of prescription medicines and vaccines.

GSKCH (GlaxoSmithKline Consumer Healthcare Pakistan Limited) sells over-the-counter medicines and consumer products.

References

GSK plc
Companies based in Karachi
Companies listed on the Pakistan Stock Exchange
Pharmaceutical companies of Pakistan
Pakistani subsidiaries of foreign companies